Walter Buchberger (24 March 1895 in Bohemia, Austria-Hungary – 1 September 1970 in Marktoberdorf, Germany) was a Czechoslovak skier of German ethnicity. He competed in Nordic combined at the 1924 Winter Olympics in Chamonix, where he placed seventh. He also competed at the 1928 Winter Olympics.

References

External links
 
 

1895 births
1970 deaths
Czechoslovak male Nordic combined skiers
Olympic Nordic combined skiers of Czechoslovakia
Nordic combined skiers at the 1924 Winter Olympics
Nordic combined skiers at the 1928 Winter Olympics
Sudeten German people